River of Ponds is a town located northeast of Daniel's Harbour, Newfoundland and Labrador. It became a Local Government Community in 1970 and had a population of 166 in 1956. The 2021 census reported a population of 173.

Demographics 

See also
List of cities and towns in Newfoundland and Labrador

References

Populated coastal places in Canada
Towns in Newfoundland and Labrador